Athletics at the 2008 Summer Paralympics were held in Beijing National Stadium from September 8 to September 17. There were 160 gold medals in this sport.

Classification
Athletes are given a classification depending on the type and extent of their disability. The classification system allows athletes to compete against others with a similar level of function.

The athletics classifications are:
 11–13: Blind athletes
 32–38: Athletes with cerebral palsy
 40: Les Autres (others) (including people with dwarfism)
 42–46: Amputees
 51–58: Athletes with a spinal cord disability

The class numbers are given prefixes  of "T", "F" and "P" for track, field and pentathlon events, respectively.

Events
For each of the events below, medals are contested for one or more of the above classifications.

Track events - Men 

 Men's 100 m
• T11 • T12 • T13
• T35 • T36 • T37
• T38 • T42 • T44
• T46 • T52 • T53
• T54
 Men's 200 m
• T11 • T12 • T13
• T36 • T37 • T38
• T44 • T46 • T52
• T53 • T54
 Men's 400 m
• T11 • T12 • T13
• T36 • T38 • T44
• T46 • T52 • T53
• T54

 Men's 800 m
• T12 • T13 • T36
• T37 • T46 • T52
• T53 • T54
 Men's 1500 m
• T11 • T13 • T46
• T54
 Men's 5000 m
• T11 • T13 • T46
• T54
 Men's 10000 m
• T12

 Men's 4 × 100 m relay
• T11–T13
• T35–T38
• T42–T46
• T53–T54
 Men's 4 × 400 m relay
• T53–T54
 Men's Marathon
• T12 • T46 • T52
• T54

Track events - Women 

 Women's 100 m
• T11 • T12 • T13
• T36 • T37 • T38
• T42 • T44 • T46
• T52 • T53 • T54
 Women's 200 m
• T11 • T12 • T13
• T36 • T37 • T38
• T44 • T46 • T52
• T53 • T54

 Women's 400 m
• T12 • T13 • T53
• T54
 Women's 800 m
• T12–13
• T53
• T54
 Women's 1500 m
• T13
• T54

 Women's 5000 m
• T54
 Women's 4 × 100 m relay
• T53–T54
 Women's Marathon
• T54

Field events - Men 

 Men's Club throw
 F32/51
 Men's Discus throw
 F11–12
 F32/51
 F33–34/52
 F35–36
 F37–38
 F42
 F44
 F53–54
 F55–56
 F57–58
 Men's High jump
 F44/46

 Men's Javelin throw
 F11–12
 F33–34/52
 F35–36
 F37–38
 F42/44
 F53–54
 F55–56
 F57–58
 Men's Long jump
 F11
 F12
 F37–38
 F42/44
 F46

 Men's Pentathlon
 P12
 P44
 Men's Shot put
 F11–12
 F32
 F33–34/52
 F35–36
 F37–38
 F40
 F42
 F44
 F53–54
 F55–56
 F57–58
 Men's Triple jump
 F11
 F12

Field events - Women 

 Women's Discus throw
 F12–13
 F32–34/51–53
 F35–36
 F37–38
 F40
 F42–46
 F54–56
 F57–58

 Women's Javelin throw
 F33–34/52–53
 F35–38
 F42–46
 F54–56
 F57–58
 Women's Long jump
 F12
 F13
 F42
 F44

 Women's Shot put
 F12–13
 F32–34/52–53
 F35–36
 F37–38
 F40
 F42–46
 F54–56
 F57–58

Participating countries
There were 1028 athletes (696 male, 332 female) from 111 countries taking part in the athletics competitions.

Medal summary

Medal table

This ranking sorts countries by the number of gold medals earned by their athletes (in this context a nation is an entity represented by a National Paralympic Committee). The number of silver medals is taken into consideration next and then the number of bronze medals. If, after the above, countries are still tied, equal ranking is given and they are listed alphabetically.

Men's events 

*David Weir was initially awarded the gold medal in the men's 800 m T54 but a re-run of the race was ordered after a lane violation was discovered. However, following a letter from Kurt Fearnley and the Australian authorities to the IPC, asking that, in the spirit of sportsmanship, the result not be overturned the re-run was cancelled and the medals reinstated.

Women's events 

† Diane Roy was initially awarded the gold, Shelly Woods the silver and Amanda McGrory the bronze in the women's 5000  m T54. However a re-run of the race was ordered by the International Paralympic Committee following protests by the Australian, US and Swiss teams after 6 competitors were involved in a crash on the penultimate lap. The re-run race resulted in the same three athletes winning medals but in a different order.

†† Rebecca Chin of Great Britain was originally awarded the silver medal in the women's discus throw F37-38 event. Following a challenge to her classification, Chin was deemed ineligible for the event, stripped of her medal, and her results were erased.

See also
Athletics at the 2008 Summer Olympics

References

External links
Official site of the 2008 Summer Paralympics

 
2008
2008 Summer Paralympics events
Paralympics
2008 Paralympics